Preston's Crossing (Manx: Crossag Preston) is a diminutive intermediate request stop on the outskirts of Laxey on the Isle of Man, forming part of the Manx Electric Railway route to the northern town of Ramsey.

Location
The line crosses a small "B" road and provides local pick-up and drop-off points for resident passengers.  It is not normally used for holiday traffic, as the following station is the main drop-off point connecting to the nearby beach.

Route

See also
 Manx Electric Railway stations

References

External links
 Manx Electric Railway Stopping Places (2002) Manx Electric Railway Society
 Island Images: Manx Electric Railway Pages (2003) Jon Wornham
 Official Tourist Department Page (2009) Isle Of Man Heritage Railways

Railway stations in the Isle of Man
Manx Electric Railway
Railway stations opened in 1894